Neil Breslin (born June 9, 1942) is an American attorney and politician serving as a member of the New York State Senate. A Democrat, he represents parts of Albany and Rensselaer counties, including all of the cities of Albany and Rensselaer and the western fourth of the city of Troy.

Breslin is currently the longest-tenured member of the New York State Senate, serving in office since 1997.

Biography
Breslin graduated from Fordham University in 1964, and received his law degree from the University of Toledo College of Law. In law school he was editor-in-chief of the Law Review and selected as the outstanding student in his class.

After admission to the bar, Breslin practiced in Albany as an associate in the firm of Garry Cahill & Edmunds, and then a partner in the reorganized Garry, Cahill, Edmunds & Breslin.  In 1981, he began to practice in partnership with his brothers Michael and Thomas (later a longtime state court judge) creating the firm Breslin, Breslin, and Breslin.  He later practiced as an "of counsel" attorney with the firm of Hiscock & Barclay. Breslin was an attorney for St. Annes Institute in Albany, and was Vice President of the Interfaith Partnership for the Homeless from 1994 to 1998.

New York Senate
Breslin was first elected to the State Senate in 1996, defeating one-term Republican incumbent Michael Hoblock by just over eight points. However, he has never faced another contest even that close in what has historically been one of the few safe Democratic districts in Upstate, and has been reelected every 2 years since. He has only dropped below 60% of the vote once since then, in 2010, but even then won by 13 points.

Hoblock had previously served as Albany County Executive and was succeeded by Neil Breslin's brother Michael after Hoblock won the State Senate seat in 1994.

Breslin had two challengers in the 2008 Democratic Primary, who cited Breslin's continued service in a law firm and family connections (one brother a county executive, the other a judge) as possible conflicts of interest.  He won the primary in September 2008 with more than 50% of the vote.  He was re-elected on November 4, 2008.

Breslin voted in favor of same-sex marriage legislation on December 2, 2009; the bill was defeated.

Breslin's 2010 bid for re-election got off to a rocky start, as the Candidate Review Committee of the Albany County Democratic Party voted to recommend no endorsement in his Senate race. Breslin was criticized during his 2010 primary campaign against Luke Martland for failing to answer questions about the content of multiple pieces of legislation he sponsored as the chair of the Insurance Committee.

With Democrats taking the majority in 2018, Breslin is serving as the Chairman of the Committee on Insurance.

Personal life 
Breslin is a native of Albany and a lifetime resident of the Capital District.

See also
 2009 New York State Senate leadership crisis

References

External links
New York State Senate: Neil D. Breslin

Living people
1942 births
Fordham University alumni
University of Toledo College of Law alumni
New York (state) lawyers
Democratic Party New York (state) state senators
Politicians from Albany, New York
21st-century American politicians